In February 2019, at least 168 people died after drinking toxic bootleg alcohol in Golaghat and Jorhat districts in Indian state of Assam.  The incident occurred two weeks after 100 people died by drinking toxic alcohol in the northern states of Uttar Pradesh and Uttarakhand.

Incident 
The poisonings first came to attention on 21 February 2019, when 42 people died shortly after drinking the illegal alcohol. Over the following days, more people died from the poisoning and many more were admitted to local hospitals. On 24 February 2019, it was reported that a total of 144 people had died and more than 300 were admitted in hospitals making it one of the deadliest alcohol poisonings in the country. The next day, the death toll had risen to 156.

The incident occurred at tea plantations in the districts. Most of the victims were labourers in these plantations. They might have bought the liquor to drink after a day's work in the plantation.

Aftermath 
Ten people have been detained for the incident.

Assam Government has announced ex-gratia of  200,000 for the dead and  50,000 to those undergoing treatment. The Government is also planning to ban and seize all illicit liquor in the state. Chief Minister Sarbananda Sonowal has ordered probe over the incident.

See also
Alcohol prohibition in India
List of alcohol poisonings in India

References

Alcohol-related deaths in India
Disasters in Assam
2019 disasters in India
Jorhat district
Golaghat district
February 2019 events in India
2010s in Assam